Solatisonax is a genus of sea snails, marine gastropod mollusks in the family Architectonicidae, the staircase shells or sundials.

Species
According to the World Register of Marine Species, the following species are included in the genus Solatisonax:
Solatisonax acutecarinata (Thiele, 1925)
Solatisonax alleryi (Seguenza G., 1876)
Solatisonax atkinsoni (E. A. Smith, 1891)
Solatisonax borealis (Verrill & Smith in Verrill, 1880)
Solatisonax cabrali Tenório, Barros, Francisco & Silva, 2011
Solatisonax certesi (Dautzenberg & H. Fischer, 1896)
Solatisonax contexta (G. Seguenza, 1876)
Solatisonax dollfusi (Dautzenberg & H. Fischer, 1896)
Solatisonax hemisphaerica (Seguenza, 1876)
Solatisonax injussa Iredale, 1931
Solatisonax kilburni Bieler, 1993
Solatisonax orba Bieler, 1993
Solatisonax propinqua Bieler, 1993
Solatisonax radialis (Dall, 1908)
Solatisonax rehderi Bieler, 1993
Solatisonax rudigerbieleri Tenório, Barros, Francisco & Silva, 2011
Solatisonax sigsbeei (Dall, 1889)
Solatisonax supraradiata (Martens, 1904)

Species brought into synonymy include:
Solatisonax bannocki (Melone & Taviani, 1980): synonym of Solatisonax hemisphaerica (Seguenza, 1876)

References

  Melone G. & Taviani M. (1985). Revisione delle Architectonicidae del Mediterraneo. Lavori, Società Italiana di Malacologia 21: 149–192

External links
 Iredale, T. (1931). Australian molluscan notes. Nº I. Records of the Australian Museum. 18(4): 201–235
  Serge GOFAS, Ángel A. LUQUE, Joan Daniel OLIVER,José TEMPLADO & Alberto SERRA (2021) – The Mollusca of Galicia Bank (NE Atlantic Ocean); European Journal of Taxonomy 785: 1–114

Architectonicidae